The Kuban Bridgehead, also known as the "Goth's head position", was a German military position on the Taman Peninsula, Russia, between the Sea of Azov and the Black Sea. Existing from January to October 1943, the bridgehead formed after the Germans were pushed out of the Caucasus. The heavily fortified position was intended as a staging area for the Wehrmacht which was to be used to renew attacks towards the oil wells of the Caucasus. Axis positions in the bridgehead were repeatedly subjected to large Soviet offensives, but none ever comprehensively broke the Axis defensive lines. The bridgehead was abandoned when the Red Army breached the Panther–Wotan line, forcing an evacuation of the German forces across the Kerch Strait to Crimea.

Prelude
Case Blue (Fall Blau), launched 28 June 1942, saw Army Group South divided into two Army Groups, Army Group A and Army Group B, the former participating in the Battle of the Caucasus. Throughout the operation the German situation, especially that of Army Group B centered on Stalingrad, began to deteriorate. As Army Group B began collapsing in the North, Army Group A quickly found itself at risk of being flanked. It was forced to abandon its task of securing the oilfields of the Caspian, and began withdrawing down the Terek River toward the Taman Peninsula.

Bridgehead 

Following the encirclement of the 6th Army at Stalingrad, Army Group A withdrew towards the Black Sea and Crimea. The 17th Army, commanded by Richard Ruoff and Erwin Jaenecke, constructed a defensive position across the Kuban River delta in the Taman Peninsula, which was completed in January 1943. The main, first defense line started by Novorossiysk and ran roughly northwards all the way across the peninsula. Consisting of 5 defense lines, the total depth of the defense area was up to 60 km. German forces, moving from positions along the Terek River, fully occupied the new defensive network in February 1943 while under constant attack by the Red Army. The bridgehead, originally intended to provide a staging area for future attempts to gain control of the Caspian oil fields, was re-tasked on 3 September 1943, as the German situation on the Eastern Front continued to deteriorate. The Kuban Bridgehead then served to evacuate German forces as the withdrawal of Army Group South to the Dnieper Line had become inevitable.

The Taman Peninsula was completely cleared of German forces on 9 October 1943.

See also 
 Kuban Shield - a military decoration given to those who fought in the Kuban bridgehead 
 Kerch-Eltigen Operation
 Courland Pocket
 Malaya Zemlya
 2nd Guards Taman Motor Rifle Division

References  

Eastern Front (World War II)
Kuban
1943 in the Soviet Union
Kuban